Sunxiuqinia rutila is a Gram-negative, facultatively anaerobic, rod-shaped and non-motile bacterium from the genus of Sunxiuqinia which has been isolated from sediments from the Nagasuka Fishery Harbor in Japan.

References

Bacteroidia
Bacteria described in 2014